The Patwardhan dynasty was an Indian dynasty established by the Chitpavan Brahmin Patwardhan family, ruling several parts of the Maratha Empire from 1733 till 1948, when it acceded to the Dominion of India. At its peak, various branches of the dynasty controlled several Jagirs within the Maratha Empire, and later became protectorate Princely states in British India. 

The branches of the dynasty, in order of creation: Kurundvad Senior (est. 1733), Miraj Senior (est. 1750), Sangli (est. 1782), Tasgaon (est. 1808), Jamkhandi (est. 1811), Miraj Junior (est. 1820), and Kurundvad Junior (est. 1854).

History
The Patwardhan family were of the Chitpavan Brahmin caste, originally from the village of Kotawde in Ratnagiri, in the present day state of Maharashtra. The patriarch of the family, Haribhat, was the family priest for another Chitpavan Brahmin family, the Joshi family, who served as the Chiefs of Ichalkaranji. Three of Haribhat's sons served the Peshwas and distinguished themselves during various military campaigns. They were each rewarded for their efforts with a Jagir, together covering all the land between the Tungabhadra and Krishna Rivers. Although significantly reduced in size, their Jagirs were later to be raised to the status of Princely state under the British Raj, and the Rajas of Jamkhandi, Kurundwad, Miraj and Sangli were all lineal descendants of these Patwardhan brothers.

After the Treaty of Salbai aligned the Marathi with the British, the three Patwardhan chiefs lent their armies in the British campaign against Tipu Sultan. They gained a reputation of heroism and success in battle. Their contributions became highly valued by the British, and in 1804 Arthur Wellesley called the Patwardhans "the most ancient friends that the British Government have in the Maratha Empire" and "the most respectable of all the Peshwa's subjects properly so called".

Branches

Kurundvad Senior
This branch was established in 1733 by Trimbakrao I of Kurundvad. This state became a British protectorate on 5 May 1819, and gained seniority when a junior branch split on 5 April 1854, forming the Kurundvad Junior State.

Miraj Senior
This branch was established in 1750 by Govindrao I of Miraj. This branch gained seniority when a junior branch split in 1820.

Sangli State
This branch was established in 1782 by Chintamanrao I of Sangli. This state also became a British protectorate on 5 May 1819. This state later became a Salute state, with a hereditary salute of 11 guns.

Tasgaon State
This branch was established in 1808 and was lapsed under Lord Dalhousie's Doctrine of Lapse in 1848.

Jamkhandi State
This branch was established in 1811 by Gopalrao Ramchandrarao of Jamkhandi.

Miraj Junior
This branch was established in 1820 by Madhavrao I of Miraj Junior.

Kurundvad Junior
This branch was established in 1854, after Trimbakrao of Kurundvad Junior and Vinayakrao of Kurundvad Junior split from the senior branch. They ruled jointly.

References

Bibliography

See also
Deccan States Agency
List of Maratha dynasties and states
List of Brahmin dynasties and states
List of princely states of British India (alphabetical)

Indian families
Hindu families
People of the Maratha Empire
Indian Hindus
History of Maharashtra
History of India
Maharashtra